Ram Laxman may refer to:

 Rama and Lakshmana, brothers in the epic Ramayana
 Ram Lakshman, a 1981 Tamil drama film
 Ram Lakhan, a 1989 Hindi film
 Ram Laxman (2004 film), a Bengali film
 Raamlaxman, film score composer